The Daro District is a district in Mukah Division, Sarawak, Malaysia. The district contains the eponymous town of Daro. The nearest town to Daro is Matu. Daro is administered under the Majlis Daerah Matu-Daro (Matu-Daro District Council), which is also the local authority for Matu District. The population in Daro was 37,900 in 2020, with Melanau making up the majority. There were ferries from Sibu to here, taking around two hours by using the channel of Rejang River.

Education

Secondary school
SMK Toh Puan Datuk Patinggi Hajjah Normah, Daro
SMK Matu
SMK Belawai
SMK SEMOP

Primary school
1. SJK (C) Chung Hua
2. SK Campuran
3. SK Hijrah Badong
4. SK Nangar
5. SK Ulu Daro
6. SK Pangtray
7. SK Semop

Climate
Daro has a tropical rainforest climate (Af) with heavy to very heavy rainfall year-round.

References

External links

 Matu & Daro District Council Official Website